Crocodilosa is a genus of spiders in the family Lycosidae. It was first described in 1947 by Caporiacco. , it contains 5 species.

References

Lycosidae
Araneomorphae genera
Spiders of Africa
Spiders of Asia